The Jester of Columbia, or simply the Jester, is a humor magazine at Columbia University in New York City. Founded on April Fool's Day, 1901, it is one of the oldest such publications in the United States. Printed continuously at least through 1997, it was revived in 2001 after a short lapse in publication and again in 2005 after another, shorter one. Jester now produces magazines and sponsors comedy events on Columbia's campus.

Issues
Excluding brief lapses in publication, the Jester has always produced issues. Jester publishes four or five times per year, with articles loosely centered around a broad theme. Issues contain a wide array of articles and jokes, such as narratives, dialogues, and articles composed of short paragraphs discussing a theme. To heighten the effect of period pieces or specific jokes, articles appear as fake documents found and scanned into the issue. Illustrations are a significant part of the magazine, with visual gags and fake ads bringing greater variety.

Jester attempts to not repeat jokes or features, except for a letters to the editor section, an editorial, called the "Editaurus," an obituary section succinctly named "Deaths," and a couple of "list" pages containing short jokes and lists. However, there are no recurring subjects, and news-style pieces rarely appear, except as "sampled" documents. Within individual issues, there are also recurring references, including ones regarding Picabo Street, the Zune, and Q-Zar.

Other activities
In addition to publishing the magazine, the group puts on comedy events, containing sketches, improv comedy, and an event reminiscent of the antics of Andy Kaufmann, where an audience was forced to watch other students eat dinner for 30 minutes while listening to madrigals.

Jester also performs a number of pranks, most recently establishing a pseudo-rivalry with the Columbia Undergraduate Science Journal, culminating in a staged theft of issues, attached rebuttals, and a parody website. The Columbia Spectator reported the event as an actual disappearance.

Alumni

 Arnold Beichman, anti-communist polemicist
Bennett Cerf, co-founder of Random House
Paul Gewirtz, law school professor, editor in 1966-67
Allen Ginsberg, poet of the Beat Generation
Gerald Green, writer
Judd Gregg, politician and lawyer
Rockwell Kent, artist, in 1903 became the Jester'''s first Art Editor
Ed Koren, New Yorker cartoonist
Tony Kushner, playwright
Robert Lax, poet
Joseph L. Mankiewicz, screenwriter
Thomas Merton, author and monk
Cliff Montgomery, football player
Ted Rall, political cartoonist
Ad Reinhardt, artist
Ed Rice, journalist
David Rosand, art professor
 Bernard Shir-Cliff (1924-2017), editor 
John Slate, aviation lawyer
Ralph de Toledano, journalist, co-founded the National Review and edited NewsweekLynd Ward, artist
Gerald Weissmann, essayist and medical scientist
Herman Wouk, writer

References

External links
Jester website
"Jester Holds Court Again", an article in the January, 2002 edition of Columbia College Today''

Satirical magazines published in the United States
College humor magazines
Columbia University publications
Magazines established in 1901
Magazines published in New York City